Do Not Hesitate is a 2021 Dutch film. It premiered at the Tribeca Film Festival. The Dutch premiere took place at the Netherlands Film Festival and was followed by a nationwide release. It was selected as the Dutch entry for the Best International Feature Film at the 94th Academy Awards.

Plot
Three young Dutch soldiers shoot a goat while guarding a truck in the middle of nowhere, during a mission in the Middle East. As stress and heat take their toll, they become increasingly disconnected to reality and their relationship with the young boy who is the goat's owner becomes more precarious, resulting in his death and their deep shock. They are rescued and recoup in Crete, where their drinking, dancing, crying and screaming is in contrast with their debrief, where nobody talks about how they feel.

Cast
 Joes Brauers - Erik
 Spencer Bogaert - Roy
 Tobias Kersloot - Thomas
 Omar Alwan - Khalil

See also
 List of submissions to the 94th Academy Awards for Best International Feature Film
 List of Dutch submissions for the Academy Award for Best International Feature Film

References

External links 
 

2021 films
2020s Dutch-language films
2020s English-language films
2021 multilingual films
Dutch multilingual films